Marcus Darrell Williams (born December 3, 1985) is an American former professional basketball player. He played with numerous teams across Europe and Asia. He was selected with the 22nd overall pick in the 2006 NBA draft by the New Jersey Nets. Prior to becoming professional player, he played college basketball for the University of Connecticut (UConn).

High school and college
Williams attended and played for Crenshaw High School in Los Angeles, California for his 9th, 10th, and 11th years, and transferred to Oak Hill Academy (Mouth of Wilson, Virginia) for his 12th year (2002–2003).

During his freshman year at UConn, Williams was suspended for part of the season because of poor grades.

As a sophomore in the 2004–05 season, Williams averaged 9.6 points and 7.8 assists a game. He was named Big East Conference Most Improved Player.

In his junior year, he was kicked off the men's basketball team for several months, for attempting to sell stolen laptop computers along with teammate A. J. Price.
Williams averaged 12.3 points, 8.6 assists, and shot 86% from the free throw line. In a game against Notre Dame, he recorded the sixth triple-double in UConn history with 18 points, 13 assists, and 10 rebounds. In the 2006 NCAA tourney, he averaged 20 points, 8.8 assists, while shooting 52% from the field, 56% from three-point range, and 96% from the free throw line. Williams scored a career-high 26 points in a memorable 98–92 overtime Sweet 16 win against Washington on March 24, 2006.

Professional career

NBA career

New Jersey Nets (2006–2008)
Williams was selected 22nd overall in the 2006 NBA draft by the New Jersey Nets, using the pick they got from the Denver Nuggets in a trade for Kenyon Martin. Former teammates Josh Boone, Rudy Gay, Hilton Armstrong, and Denham Brown were also selected, with all but Brown being first-round picks. Marcus Williams was named to the Rookie team for the 2007 T-Mobile Rookie Challenge at the 2007 NBA All-Star Weekend. As a rookie in 2006–07, Williams played in 79 games, averaging 6.8 ppg and 3.3 apg.

Golden State Warriors (2008–2009)
On July 22, 2008, Marcus Williams was traded by the Nets to the Golden State Warriors for a conditional first-round pick. On March 10, 2009, he was released by the team.

Memphis Grizzlies (2009–2010)
In July 2009, Williams began playing on the Memphis Grizzlies Summer League team in Las Vegas, Nevada. He joined 2009 first-round pick Hasheem Thabeet, undrafted rookie free agent Jeff Adrien, and Rudy Gay as one of four former UConn Huskies on the Grizzlies' Summer League roster. On August 7, 2009, Williams officially signed with the Grizzlies.

International career

Piratas de Quebradillas (2009)

Williams signed with Piratas de Quebradillas of the Puerto Rican Basketball League (BSN) in late March 2009. During the first half of the season, Williams averaged 15.0 points per game, 5.3 rebounds and 9.3 assists. He had registered one triple-double and was the league-leader in assists. He was also selected to play in the league's All-Star game and won the game's MVP award, as well as winning the Skills Contest. He also finished the season earning All-BSN First Team honors with teammate Peter John Ramos, and helping the Pirates to the best record in the league. Because he went to the Memphis Grizzlies' summer league team and left the Pirates, he missed the league finals, and the Pirates lost the championship.

Enisey Krasnoyark (2010–2011)
In August 2010, Williams signed a one-year contract with the Russian team Enisey Krasnoyarsk. Quickly becoming leader of his new team, Williams helped Enisey qualify to playoff for the first time in club's history. In quarterfinals Enisey lost series to Lokomotiv-Kuban (1:2). Williams was named "Player of the Month" in Russian PBL League in November and December. He was also selected All-Star 2nd team. Williams finished season with 14.8 points per game and as league's best in total assists (184) and assist per game (6.8).

Jiangsu Dragons (2011–2012)
In late November 2011, Williams signed a contract with the Jiangsu Dragons of China. In 25 games, he averaged 11.1 points, 3.2 rebounds, 3.8 assists and 1.2 steals in 25.8 minutes.

Unicaja Málaga (2012–2013)
In 2012, Williams signed a one-year contract with the Spanish team Unicaja Málaga. In 53 games, he averaged 9.6 points, 2.6 rebounds and 3.3 assists in 22.2 minutes.

Lokomotiv Kuban Krasnodar (2013–2014)
On August 19, 2013, Williams signed a contract with the Russian team Lokomotiv Kuban Krasnodar. In 47 games, he averaged 9 points, 2.6 rebounds and 4.2 assists in 25.6 minutes.

Crvena zvezda (2014–2015)
On August 15, 2014, Williams signed a one-year deal with Serbian team Crvena zvezda. On November 22, 2014, in a game against Galatasaray, Williams set a Euroleague record for the most assists in a single game (17). He also added 8 points while shooting just 3–16 from the field. However, his team lost after double overtime with 110–103. With Crvena zvezda, he won the Adriatic League championship, the Serbian League championship and the Radivoj Korać Cup.

On November 3, 2015, he re-signed with Crvena zvezda, but on December 28, 2015, he and the team parted ways.

Budućnost Podgorica (2016–2017)
On July 27, 2016, Williams signed with Montenegrin club Budućnost Podgorica for the 2016–17 season. On March 26, 2017, he was released by Budućnost. In 27 league games, he averaged 10.3 points, 2.5 rebounds and 6.1 assists in 25.4 minutes, while averaging 12.3 points, 1.3 rebounds, 5.1 assists and 27. minutes in 7 Eurocup games.

Cholet Basket (2017)
On 29 March 2017, Williams signed with Cholet Basket for the rest of the season. In 9 games, he averaged, 8.3 points, 2 rebounds and 3.4 assists in 23.1 minutes.

Reno Bighorns (2017–2018)
On September 26, 2017 Williams signed with the Sacramento Kings. On October 10, 2017, he was waived by the Kings after appearing in two pre-season games. On October 21, he signed with the Reno Bighorns, where he averaged 10.8 points, 2.9 rebounds, 6.5 assists and 26.6 minutes in 49 games.

Second Stint with Piratas de Quebradillas (2018)
On April 26, 2018, Williams was reported to have signed with Piratas de Quebradillas of the Baloncesto Superior Nacional.

Stockton Kings (2018–2019)
For the 2018–19 season, Williams re-joined the G League with the Stockton Kings. On February 5, 2019, Williams was suspended for five games without pay for violating the terms of the league's anti-drug program.

Career statistics

NBA

Regular season

|-
| align="left" | 
| align="left" | New Jersey
| 79 || 2 || 16.6 || .395 || .282 || .847 || 2.1 || 3.3 || .4 || .0 || 6.8
|-
| align="left" | 
| align="left" | New Jersey
| 53 || 7 || 16.1 || .379 || .380 || .787 || 1.9 || 2.6 || .5 || .1 || 5.9
|-
| align="left" | 
| align="left" | Golden State
| 9 || 0 || 6.0 || .235 || .333 || .333 || .4 || 1.4 || .1 || .1 || 1.3
|-
| align="left" | 
| align="left" | Memphis
| 62 || 1 || 14.1 || .384 || .296 || .673 || 1.5 || 2.6 || .5 || .0 || 4.3
|- class="sortbottom"
| style="text-align:center;" colspan="2"| Career
| 203 || 10 || 15.2 || .386 || .321 || .767 || 1.8 || 2.8 || .4 || .0 || 5.6

Playoffs

|-
| align="left" | 2007
| align="left" | New Jersey
| 12 || 0 || 6.5 || .333 || .077 || .800 || .8 || 1.1 || .1 || .0 || 2.4
|- class="sortbottom"
| style="text-align:center;" colspan="2"| Career
| 12 || 0 || 6.5 || .333 || .077 || .800 || .8 || 1.1 || .1 || .0 || 2.4

Euroleague

|-
| style="text-align:left;"| 2012–13
| style="text-align:left;"| Unicaja
| 24 || 5 || 21.7 || .362 || .371 || .667 || 2.7 || 3.3 || .6 || .0 || 10.5 || 9.4
|-
| style="text-align:left;"| 2013–14
| style="text-align:left;"| Lokomotiv
| 24 || 10 || 23.0 || .331 || .278 || .756 || 2.2 || 3.8 || .3 || .0 || 7.3 || 6.9
|-
| style="text-align:left;"| 2014–15
| style="text-align:left;"| Crvena zvezda
| 24 || 23 || 25.8 || .317 || .292 || .755 || 3.2 || 6.1 || .8 || .0 || 9.7 || 10.7
|- class="sortbottom"
| style="text-align:center;" colspan="2"| Career
| 72 || 38 || 25.5 || .337 || .318 || .723 || 2.7 || 4.4 || .6 || .0 || 8.9 || 9.0

References

External links

 
 
 Marcus Williams at eurobasket.com
 Marcus Williams at euroleague.net
 Marcus Williams at nbadraft.net
 Marcus Williams at uconnhuskies.com
 Marcus Williams at usabasketball.com
 

1985 births
Living people
21st-century African-American sportspeople
African-American basketball players
American expatriate basketball people in China
American expatriate basketball people in France
American expatriate basketball people in Montenegro
American expatriate basketball people in Russia
American expatriate basketball people in Serbia
American expatriate basketball people in Spain
American men's basketball players
Baloncesto Málaga players
Basketball players from Los Angeles
BC Enisey players
BC UNICS players
Big3 players
Cholet Basket players
Crenshaw High School alumni
Golden State Warriors players
Jiangsu Dragons players
KK Budućnost players
KK Crvena zvezda players
Liga ACB players
Memphis Grizzlies players
New Jersey Nets draft picks
New Jersey Nets players
Oak Hill Academy (Mouth of Wilson, Virginia) alumni
PBC Lokomotiv-Kuban players
Piratas de Quebradillas players
Point guards
Reno Bighorns players
Stockton Kings players
UConn Huskies men's basketball players
20th-century African-American people
American men's 3x3 basketball players